Belizario is both a given name and a surname. Notable people with the name include:
Belizario Herrera (born 1962), Mexican politician
Marlyn Belizario Alonte-Naguiat (born 1974), Filipino politician

Masculine given names